There are a number of widely reported haunted locations in the state of Oregon in the United States. Many reported hauntings in Oregon are linked to such historic places as the Oregon Trail and early coastal communities. Portland, the state's largest city and metropolitan area, was considered one of the most dangerous port cities in the world at the turn of the 20th century. Its gritty history includes many locations alleged or reported to be haunted. In 2012, USA Today named Portland among the top ten most haunted cities in the United States.

Reportedly haunted locales in Portland include the Bagdad Theater, a vaudeville theater built by Universal Studios in 1927, which is reportedly haunted by a maintenance man who committed suicide in the building; Pittock Mansion, a mansion overlooking the city that is reportedly haunted by its original owners; the Roseland Theater, a former church and music venue that is haunted by a club promoter who was murdered there; and, perhaps most widely reported, the city's Shanghai tunnels, made up of various passages that run beneath the streets of Northwest Portland that were used to smuggle prostitutes and sailors onto ships in the port, where they were often sold into slavery or forced labor.

Other locations alleged to be haunted include the Hot Lake Hotel in Union County; the Multnomah County Poor Farm in Troutdale; Rhododendron Village, a stop along the Oregon Trail near Mount Hood; and the Welches Roadhouse, where a pregnant woman jumped to her death.

Northeast

Northwest

Southwest

Southeast

Central

Coastal

See also

 List of reportedly haunted locations in the United States
 List of reportedly haunted locations in the world

References

Sources

Further reading